The Mill on the Floss is a 1936 British drama film directed by Tim Whelan and starring Frank Lawton, Victoria Hopper, Geraldine Fitzgerald and James Mason. It was based on the 1860 novel The Mill on the Floss by George Eliot.

The film was made at Shepperton Studios. Although he is not credited in the film, Basil Dean, who was married to the leading lady Victoria Hopper, was heavily involved in the planning and the production of the film.

Cast
 Frank Lawton as Philip Wakem
 Victoria Hopper as Lucy Deane
 Fay Compton as Mrs Tulliver
 Geraldine Fitzgerald as Maggie
 Griffith Jones as Stephen Guest
 Mary Clare as Mrs Moss
 James Mason as Tom Tulliver
 Athene Seyler as Mrs Pullet
 Sam Livesey as Mr Tulliver
 Amy Veness as Mrs Deane
 Felix Aylmer as Mr Wakem
 Eliot Makeham as Mr Pullet
 William Devlin as Bob Jakin
 Ivor Barnard as Mr Moss
 David Horne as Mr Deane
 O. B. Clarence as Mr. Gore  
 W.E. Holloway as D. Stelling 
 Arthur West Payne  as Young Bob Jakin 
 Cecil Ramage as Luke

DVD release
The Mill on the Floss was released on Region 0 DVD-R by Alpha Video on 28 January 2014.

References

Bibliography
 Harper, Graeme & Rayner, Jonathan R. Cinema and Landscape. Intellect Books, 2010.

External links
 

1936 films
Films set in the 1820s
Films set in England
British historical drama films
1930s historical drama films
British black-and-white films
Films shot at Shepperton Studios
Films directed by Tim Whelan
Films based on British novels
1936 drama films
1930s English-language films
1930s British films